Alberta Provincial Highway No. 595, also known as Highway 595, is a short highway in the province of Alberta, Canada.

Prior to the completion of Highway 11 in the early 1990s, Highway 595 was Red Deer's main eastern approach.

Major intersections 
Starting from the west end of Highway 595:

References 

595
Transport in Red Deer, Alberta